The Talking Rob is a Hungarian film that was shot partially in colour and directed by Géza Radványi. It was produced in 1941. It was based on Kálmán Mikszáth’s novel on the same title. It was the first Hungarian film with outdoor scenes utilising Agfacolor colour technology.

Characters
 Pál Jávor - Mihály Lestyák Junior
 Ferenc Kiss - Mihály Lestyák
 Mária Tasnády Fekete - Cinna
 Gyula Csortos - Pasha of Buda
 Tivadar Bilicsi - Putnoky
 Béla Mihályffi - Ágoston
 Lehotay Árpád - Mihály Szűcs Mihály, judge
 József Bihari - Pintyő
 Sándor Tompa - Máté Puszta
 László Szilassy - Mehmed II
 Erzsi Orsolya - Sára, Gipsy lady
 József Juhász - Bey Olaj
 Piri Vaszary - Mrs Fábián

References

Sources
 Port.hu
 

1941 films
1940s fantasy films
Hungarian fantasy films
Films set in the 1600s